The Sea Knows is a 1961 South Korean film directed by Kim Ki-young.

Plot
The film is a wartime melodrama about Aroun, a Korean living in Japan and conscripted into the army. He endures cruel treatment at the hands of the Japanese soldiers, and objections from the mother of his Japanese girlfriend. The film concludes with a U.S. bombing which kills all the Japanese soldiers, but leaves Aroun alive.

Cast
Kim Wun-ha as Aroun
Gong Midori as Hideko
Lee Ye-chun as Mori
Lee Sang-sa as Inoue
Kim Jin-kyu as Nakamura
Kim Seok-hun
Ju Jeung-ryu as Hideko's mother
Kim Seung-ho
Park Am
Park Nou-sik

References

Bibliography

External links

1960s Korean-language films
South Korean drama films
Films directed by Kim Ki-young